Clifton Forge Residential Historic District is a national historic district located at Clifton Forge, Alleghany County, Virginia. The district encompasses 728 contributing buildings and two contributing sites in a predominantly residential section of Clifton Forge.  It primarily includes single-family frame vernacular dwellings dating to the turn-of-the 20th century. They are vernacular interpretations of a variety of popular architectural styles including Queen Anne, Colonial Revival, and Bungalow. Notable non-residential buildings include the Clifton Forge High School (1928), First Baptist Church (c. 1892), Main Street Baptist Church (1921), First Christian Church (1906), Presbyterian Church (1907), Methodist Church (1908–1910), Clifton Forge Baptist Church (1912), Clifton Forge Woman's Club (1939), and Clifton Forge Armory (1940–1941). Memorial Park and Crown Hill Cemetery are contributing sites. Located in the district and separately listed is the Jefferson School.

It was added to the National Register of Historic Places in 2012.

References

Historic districts in Alleghany County, Virginia
Colonial Revival architecture in Virginia
Queen Anne architecture in Virginia
National Register of Historic Places in Alleghany County, Virginia
Historic districts on the National Register of Historic Places in Virginia